Scrobipalpa chinensis is a moth in the family Gelechiidae. It was described by Povolný in 1969. It is found in China (Yunnan).

The forewings are uniform graphite to brownish grey. The hindwings are shining grey.

References

Scrobipalpa
Moths described in 1969
Taxa named by Dalibor Povolný